LARP Alliance, Inc. was a non-profit organization based in the US, which was established in order to improve communication, support, and education regarding Live Action Roleplaying (LARP) throughout the entire  community and with the general public. Programs and events designed to achieve this are run often and the LARP Alliance assists others by providing staff, props, resource materials, and contributing donated promotional items.  The company exists to motivate and inspire the LARP community and bridge the gap to bring in new LARPers.

History
Prior to achieving non-profit status, the company goals had already been enacted and carried out regularly by the founders, Rick McCoy (LARP Historian, Weapon-maker, Game Mechanics/Rules Designer, Promoter) and Adrianne Grady (Game Designer, Promoter, Artist) independently.  It was in 2001 that the original mission statement, "Uniting the Hobby One LARP At a Time", was developed by Rick McCoy.  In 2003, Adrianne Grady began working with Rick McCoy to establish future goals after the founders made contact. And in 2004, Rick McCoy, Adrianne Grady, and Chris Vrem (creator of "Vrem Blades", the well-known weapon-making style of the IFGS LARPs) united to establish the LARP Alliance entity.  The mission statement was later evolved by the LARP Alliance, a couple of years after the company became a corporation, into the present mission statement, "To strengthen and bring together LARPers by developing resources for players and staff; assisting with promotions, venues, and organizing community events; and facilitating education and training." LARP Alliance has since ceased operation as of 2012.

Media Assistance
The LARP Alliance, and Co-Founder, Adrianne Grady are credited with assisting Universal Studios and David Wain with the comedy movie Role Models.  Rick McCoy and Adrianne Grady also assisting Joe Lynch with the horror/adventure movie Knights of Badassdom. LARP Alliance brought Iron Liege (a US-based LARP weapon and gear manufacturer) into the project to provide the majority of all on-screen weapons and shields used by the lead characters and LARPer extras. LARP Alliance, Inc. assisted in providing a number of real LARPers hired onto the movie project, arriving from all over the world, to be extras. LARPs represented by those real LARPers include the [IFGS], [NERO], Maelstrom, Dagorhir, Adventures Unlimited / Realms of Conflict, Eidolon, Apocalarp, Amtgard, and more.

Adrianne Grady, Rick McCoy, and the LARP Alliance have also assisted other productions including the movie Lloyd the Conqueror, Tosh.0 show and G4, WebTV, History Channel, Spike TV, Boing BoingTV, the band A Hawk and A Hacksaw's "Cervantine" music video, and Sony PlayStation: God of War II.

LARPMedia.com was developed and implemented for the community by the LARP Alliance to showcase LARP-related media such as movies, episodics, music videos, and other productions.

Their work has included assisting LARPers with their on-camera presence, alerting them to media opportunities such as television shows, documentaries, music videos, and movies, and connecting LARPs and LARPers with legal advisors.  They have also brought together LARP-artisans (costumers, weapon and propmakers) with media project directors.  Additionally, the LARP Alliance assists in the enhancement of the LARP community's visual and audio presentation within itself and to the general public by use of special videos and photography.

Events
 Xatrian Crux - a multi-genre sci-fi-based event whose system is designed to allow characters from any LARP to come in and play.
 ERIAL Battle Royale - a medieval/fantasy event based on the movie Role Models and its fantasy game called LAIRE which is a LARP promotional tool aimed at the general public and current LARP community.
 LARP Con - similar in concept to Intercon LARP conventions, with a World Con model in mind, and held on the west coast.  LARP Con creators, Adrianne Grady and Rick McCoy, brought the LARP Con project to Ira Ham in a partnership agreement that developed Wyrd Con, the first west coast LARP convention.
 LARP Quest - a company developed as a side project within LARP Alliance to provide a series of mini line course LARP events designed to be incorporated into various environments and events for entertainment and/or education.  LARP Quest has assisted Mattel, Theatre Unleashed, and other companies.

Other Programs and Projects
LARP Meetups are held monthly to discuss and brainstorm over LARP concepts and the overall state of LARP in the world.  The LARP Alliance is behind a number of large and small game rules revisions and creations currently in use across the US (Realms of Conflict, Live Effects games, Eidolon, and others).
Fighter Practices - Showcasing new acting/fighting/rules techniques at LARP Alliance events and conventions including (World Con, Wyrd Con, Gen Con, Comic Con, and Strategicon) - Fighter practices are held in multiple regions to spotlight various LARP styles (such as IFGS, NERO, Adventures Unlimited, Dagorhir, and many others), and give equal opportunity to all current and potential LARPers.
LARP Space - The first online multi-genre and multi-LARP community of its kind - global outreach
Support numerous Charities
Multi-LARP and multi-genre events & Maintaining a public LARP Events Calendar (globally inclusive)
Workshops/Classes/Training - Weapon-building (in a variety of styles), Role-play and character development, Costuming and Prop-making
Provide ideas/concepts on rules, business, and more to LARPs and LARPers (Assisted Adventures Unlimited, Live Effects, and others)
Bi-Monthly globally inclusive newsletter and articles throughout the LARP community
Promoting LARPs via websites and articles (assisting in the rapid growth of all SoCal LARPs)
Spotlight - LARPer of the Year, LARPer of the Month
Transportation assistance to and from events & Player-Share Program
LARP Album - "The Gallivanter's Rhapsody" - LARP Alliance is the director and distributor of this compilation album and first of its kind.  The LARP Album is a multi-genre collection of original LARP-inspired songs and comical audio pieces (in conjunction with Knollwit Studio) contributed to by various LARP organizations and artists. It spotlights a variety of IC (In-Character) and OOC (Out-Of-Character) pieces (similar in concept to a "Best Of" Album).

In-game tools
The Adventurer's Guild (aka The Academy) is an in-game and in-character assistant directed at newbies (new LARPers or those new to a specific game system). This traveling unit provides game rules instructions and character skill practice, teaches strategy/battle prep, all while keeping players in-character and giving them each specific character plot.

Other contributions
They have contributed hundreds of weapons and props/sets/effects to LARP functions and players in order to showcase new product and provide gear to those who have none. They often are known to contribute other items and labor such as food, cooking and construction labor, and talent (musicians, actors, dancers, etc.) to enhance the atmosphere of the games.

See also
 Live action role-playing game
 Dream Park
 SCA
 Role Models
 Amtgard
  The Camarilla, White Wolf's World of Darkness Fan club and LARPing group.

References
 Role Models
 Knights of Badassdom
 Shade's LARP List
 The Book of LARP Live Action Role Playing

External links
 LARP Alliance
 LARP Passions
 LARP Space
 LRP Alliance UK
 IMDB.com - LARP Alliance

Notes

Non-profit organizations based in the United States
Role-playing game associations